Alangudi  is a village in the Nannilam taluk of Tiruvarur district in Tamil Nadu, India.

Demographics 

As per the 2001 census, Alangudi had a population of 1,464 with 763 males and 701 females. The sex ratio was 919. The literacy rate was 76.55.

References 
 

Villages in Tiruvarur district